Hasselt railway station, officially Hasselt, is a railway station in Hasselt, Limburg, Belgium. The station opened on 24 October 1843 and it is located at 21 Stationsplein (Station Square). It is served by railway lines 15, 21, 21A, 34 and 35. The train services are operated by the National Railway Company of Belgium (NMBS/SNCB).

Train services
The station is served by the following services:

Intercity services (IC-03) Knokke/Blankenberge - Bruges - Ghent - Brussels - Leuven - Hasselt - Genk
Intercity services (IC-08) Antwerp - Mechelen - Brussels Airport - Leuven - Hasselt
Intercity services (IC-09) Antwerp - Lier - Aarschot - Hasselt - Liège (weekends)
Intercity services (IC-10) Antwerp - Mol - Hasselt
Intercity services (IC-13) Hasselt - Liers - Liège - Visè - Maastricht (weekdays)
Intercity services (IC-20) Ghent - Aalst - Brussels - Hasselt - Tongeren (weekdays)
Local services (L-03) Leuven - Aarschot - Diest - Hasselt

See also
 List of railway stations in Belgium

References

External links
 
 Hasselt railway station at Belgian Railways website

Railway stations in Belgium
Railway stations in Limburg (Belgium)
Buildings and structures in Hasselt
1847 establishments in Belgium
Railway stations in Belgium opened in 1847